The Willie Tax is the municipal 1% tax imposed on the residents of the city of Caguas, Puerto Rico. The name is derived from the proponent mayor William Miranda Marín. The tax was levied in September 2005 after much debate and protest from the local residents. It was levied as a way to charge residents for the waste disposal that the municipalities have to provide by law. It has resulted in an estimated $500,000 city income.

Waste legislation in the United States